Emile Albert Métin (28 January 1871 – 16 August 1918) was a French teacher and professor of history and geography, a prolific author and a politician who was twice Minister of Labor and Social Welfare.

Life

Early years
Albert Métin was born on 23 January 1871 in Besançon, Doubs.
He was a brilliant scholar, and gained degrees in History and Geography.
He became a professor at the Conservatoire national des arts et métiers.

Métin was one of the first to receive a travel grant from the University of Paris.
He spent 18 months travelling around the world, and visited Australia and New Zealand.
In New Zealand in 1899 he found that the radical social legislation in New Zealand had been implemented in a series of pragmatic steps that addressed specific issues, and had little grounding in political theory.
He could not understand how New Zealand could have the world's "most advanced labor legislation" with "the weakest labor party."
He coined the phrase "Socialism with no doctrine" (Le socialisme sans doctrines) to describe the Australasian reforms.

On his return Métin wrote Le socialisme sans doctrines: la question agraire et la question ouvrière en Australie et Nouvelle-Zélande in which he described "these countries in which the state has set limits to the right of property, has instituted the eight-hour day, the minimum wage, compulsory arbitration, with many other measures which have given the English antipodean colonies the surname Paradise of Workingmen."
He strongly disapproved of the support given by labor to queen, empire and church. 
He wrote that labor was, "not in the least interested in building a socialist society, but in aping the bourgeoisie and in winning for themselves all the concessions and advantages possible within a capitalist society."

In October 1904 Métin was head of a French delegation that visited the Louisiana Purchase Exposition in St. Louis, US. 
The delegation visited Quebec, mainly Quebec City and Montreal, from 12–15 October.
The party included several leading radicals, including Alphonse Verville, Joseph-Alphonse Rodier, Joseph Ainey, Isisdore Tremblay and Narcisse Arcand.

Pre-war politics

On the basis of his work on foreign labor laws Métin was selected by René Viviani as chief of staff in the Ministry of Labor when it was created by Georges Clemenceau in 1906.
Métin was elected Deputy for the second district of Besançon on 12 December 1909, and was reelected on 24 April 1910 and on 26 April 1914 as a Democratic Republican.
He sat with the radical socialists. He also became General Councillor of Doubs. 
In the period before World War I (1914–18) he was a member of commissions on social security, civil pensions, fiscal legislation, the budget and foreign affairs. 
On 9 December 1913 Gaston Doumergue appointed him Minister of Labor and Social Security, a position he held until 3 June 1914.
He was supported by the journal le Petit Comtois, which in January 1914 reported his work to give workers access to low-cost housing, to improve old age pensions, particularly for women and widows, to obtain disability pensions and to provide insurance against agricultural accidents.
The journal published his historical history of Ornans and Amancey.

World War I

After the declaration of war Métin was mobilized and served as an infantry lieutenant on the eastern front.
Métin returned to the chamber, and was general rapporteur for the budget committee.
He was again appointed Minister of Labor and Social Security from 29 October 1915 to 12 December 1916 in the cabinet of Aristide Briand.
He was Sub-Secretary of State for Finance from 14 December 1916 to 17 August 1917.
On 27 July 1917 Denys Cochin submitted his resignation as sub-secretary of state for Foreign Affairs, largely due to frustration over difficulties in achieving a full blockade of Germany and her allies.
The cabinet accepted Cochin's resignation on 10 August 1917.
Metin took his place, holding office until Clemenceau created a blockade ministry under Charles-Célestin Jonnart on 17 November 1917.
Métin was then appointed head of the French mission to Australia. His friend André Siegfried was secretary general of the mission from July 1918.
Métin died on 16 August 1918 in San Francisco of apoplexy, thought to have been caused by the strain of his work on the mission.
He was a knight of the Legion of Honor.

Publications
Albert Métin was a prolific author. Some of his books went through several editions, in some cases revised and updated by others.

Textbooks

History and Geography

Other works

Translations

Notes

Sources

External links
 

1871 births
1918 deaths
Politicians of the French Third Republic
French Ministers of Labour and Social Affairs